Netball New South Wales Blues are a former Australian netball team. Between 2008 and 2014, they represented Netball New South Wales in the Australian Netball League. In 2008 they were founder members of the ANL. Together with Netball New South Wales Waratahs they were one of two teams to represent Netball New South Wales in the ANL. Blues were effectively a New South Wales Swifts third team.

History

Australian Netball League
Between 2008 and 2014, Netball New South Wales Blues represented Netball New South Wales in the Australian Netball League. In 2008 they were founder members of the ANL. Together with Netball New South Wales Waratahs they were one of two teams to represent Netball New South Wales in the ANL.

Regular season statistics

Notable players

Internationals

 Samantha Poolman
 Amorette Wild

New South Wales Swifts

Giants Netball

Captains

ANL MVP

Head coaches

References

 
Blues
Defunct netball teams in Australia
Australian Netball League teams
Netball teams in Sydney
Netball
Sports clubs established in 2008
2008 establishments in Australia
2014 disestablishments in Australia 
Sports clubs disestablished in 2014